Stephen Alvin Johnson (August 15, 1922 – May 5, 2011) was an American football player, coach of football and baseball, and college athletics administrator.
He was drafted by the Philadelphia Eagles in the 14th round (121st overall) of the 1947 NFL Draft. With the Eagles in 1948, he won an NFL Championship. He served as the head football coach at Western New Mexico University in Silver City, New Mexico from 1950 to 1966. He also coached the baseball team at Western New Mexico from 1955 to 1970. He died at his home in Grants, New Mexico in 2011

References

External links
 
 Western New Mexico Hall of Fame profile
 

1922 births
2011 deaths
American football punters
American football quarterbacks
Hardin–Simmons Cowboys football players
Philadelphia Eagles players
Western New Mexico Mustangs athletic directors
Western New Mexico Mustangs baseball coaches
Western New Mexico Mustangs football coaches
People from Hamlin, Texas
People from Munday, Texas
Players of American football from Texas
People from Grants, New Mexico